are subjects for daily meditation at Japan's Naval Academy.

Five Reflections

These reflections were originally devised by Vice Admiral Hajime Matsushita, who was the Chief of the Imperial Japanese Naval Academy, and used from 1932 to its abolishment in 1945. Every evening cadets are expected to meditate on these inter-related questions.
 
 
 
 
 

The Japan Maritime Self Defense Force (JMSDF), from its establishment in 1954, encourages the use of the Gosei as a self-reflective exercise during the course of daily living.

The crux of this contemplative practice has been translated into English and has been discussed at the United States Naval Academy.

Notes

References
 Kennedy, Maxwell Taylor. (2009). Danger's Hour: The Story of the USS Bunker Hill and the Kamikaze Pilot Who Crippled Her. New York: Simon and Schuster. ; 
 Smith, Peter C. (2006). Fist from the Sky: Japan's Dive-Bomber Ace of World War II.  Mechanicsburg, Pennsylvania: Stackpole. ;

See also
 Five Precepts

External links
 Precepts of Ieyasu Tokugawa

Codes of conduct
1932 documents
Imperial Japanese Navy